Cobetia crustatorum is a Gram-negative, slightly halophilic, aerobic and straight-rod-shaped bacterium from the genus of Cobetia which has been isolated from jeotgal.

References

Oceanospirillales
Bacteria described in 2010